Mariella Frostrup (born 12 November 1962) is a British journalist and presenter, known in British television and radio mainly for arts programmes.

Early life
Frostrup was born in Oslo, Norway, to Peter and Joan Frostrup, but moved with her family when she was six to Ireland in 1969, living in Kilmacanogue, a small village near the town of Greystones in County Wicklow. Her Norwegian father, who died aged 44 when Frostrup was 15, was a journalist (including Foreign Editor) on The Irish Times, and her Scottish mother an artist.<ref>Mariella Frostrup: "Mariella Frostrup: Everyone's best friend (especially George Clooney)", 'The Independent, Sunday, 06 July 2008.</ref> She has four siblings.

Career
After the death of her father, in 1977 she moved to London. There she worked as a public relations executive for Phonogram Records between 1980 and 1990; coordinated the publicity for the Live Aid concert at Wembley in 1985; and, after leaving Phonogram, started television work as a presenter and film critic.

Frostrup presented the Channel 4 music show Big World Cafe in 1989 alongside Eagle Eye Cherry and Jazzie B.

She also presented Thames Television's Video View from 1990 and, after Thames lost the London ITV franchise, reprised the role straight afterwards on The Little Picture Show for Carlton Television from 1993.

Frostrup has interviewed many celebrities, writers and artists and has presented a variety of television programmes, including one on travel, and has appeared in other television shows such as the series Have I Got News for You and the sitcom Absolutely Fabulous. She made several guest appearances as herself in the series Coupling, including an episode where one of the characters fantasizes about her, then meets her in person. She has also appeared in fictionalised form in Michael Paraskos's In Search of Sixpence.

She has written for The Daily Telegraph as a travel writer, The Guardian, The Observer, The Mail on Sunday, Harpers & Queen and the New Statesman. For almost 20 years until 2021 she was The Observer's agony aunt on its relationships page. She is also an art critic and has been on the judging panels for the Booker Prize, the Orange Prize for Fiction and the Evening Standard British Film Awards.

In September 2007 she chaired a question-and-answer session with British Prime Minister Gordon Brown, at the Labour Party Conference in Bournemouth, Dorset.

In 2008, Frostrup received an Honorary Degree of Doctor of Letters from Nottingham Trent University in recognition of her contribution and commitment to journalism and broadcasting.

She presented the BBC Radio 2 show The Green Room and was from 2002 to 2020 the regular presenter of BBC Radio 4 programme Open Book, interviewing authors and publishers and reviewing new fiction and non-fiction books. As the presenter of The Book Show on Sky Arts 1, she interviewed an extensive list of guests on their recent works and their "favourite heroes and heroines from fiction". The show was cancelled in 2013.

In December 2012, she appeared on the BBC Two series World's Most Dangerous Roads, in which she and Angus Deayton were filmed driving along the east coast of Madagascar.

She is the voice in lifts on the London Overground. Her 'gravelly' voice is often used on television commercials and in 2005 was voted the sexiest female voice on television.

In 2018, Frostrup presented a documentary for BBC One called The Truth About The Menopause. She later published a book on the subject and has spoken of her own experience of menopause.

In 2019, she presented a programme for BBC Radio 4 called Bringing Up Britain.

In June 2020 she joined Times Radio to present a programme in the early afternoon from Monday to Thursday. It features celebrity interviews, alongside arts, culture and social issues coverage.

In 2022, Frostrup is the presenter of the documentary series Britain's Novel Landscapes with Mariella Frostrup; which investigates how British landscapes have influenced some of the UK's best loved authors.

Advocacy
Frostrup's political views have been described as "a bit left-of-centre". She has been active in the charity sector for two decades, having worked on Bank Aid and Comic Relief along with various fundraising initiatives for Oxfam, The Children's Society and Save the Children. Campaigning for women's rights and gender equality has become her main focus; she has recently made several trips to Africa to meet women and young girls in their communities, and experience first hand the realities and inequalities of the lives that they lead.

In 2010 she created, along with three other trustees, the Gender Rights and Equality Action Trust. This foundation aims at fostering gender equality and raising awareness and funds, to support grass roots gender equality projects in Africa and beyond. The GREAT Initiative works in partnership with Femmes Africa Solidarité, an African charity.

In 2015 she signed an open letter which the ONE Campaign had been collecting signatures for; the letter was addressed to Angela Merkel and Nkosazana Dlamini-Zuma, urging them to focus on women as they serve as the head of the G7 in Germany and the African Union in South Africa respectively, which will start to set the priorities in development funding before a main UN summit in September 2015 that will establish new development goals for the generation.

In 2021 she became President of the Somerset branch of CPRE, the Countryside Charity.

In 2022 she founded Menopause Mandate with Davina McCall, Penny Lancaster and others, to campaign for greater awareness of the impact of the menopause.

Personal life
Frostrup was first married (1979–1984) to Richard Jobson, lead singer with the punk rock group Skids. On a charity trek in Nepal, aged 39, Frostrup met human rights lawyer Jason McCue. They were married two years later. They live near Bruton, Somerset (with a flat in London), and have two children.

She is a close friend of Penny Smith (a television presenter) and of Gina Bellman, an actress who was one of the stars of Coupling, in which she had a cameo role alongside Angus Deayton.

 References 

 Bibliography 
 Frostrup, Mariella – Dear Mariella: an Indispensable Guide to Twenty-First Century Living – Bloomsbury, 2004 
 Frostrup, Mariella – Cracking the Menopause: While Keeping Yourself Together'' – Bluebird, 2021

External links 

 
 Journalisted – Articles by Mariella Frostrup 
 The Book Show on Sky Arts website
 The Truth About The Menopause on BBC TV website
 The GREAT Initiative
 

1962 births
English people of Scottish descent
Norwegian emigrants to Ireland
Norwegian emigrants to the United Kingdom
Living people
People from County Wicklow
British journalists
BBC television presenters
Women television journalists
BBC radio presenters
British women radio presenters
British newspaper journalists
British women columnists
British radio personalities
Television personalities from London
British mass media people